Tursugali (Türhägäźe) is a rural locality (a village) in Tashtamaksky Selsoviet, Aurgazinsky District, Bashkortostan, Russia. The population was 175 as of 2010. There are 4 streets.

Geography 
Tursugali is located 15 km west of Tolbazy (the district's administrative centre) by road. Gumerovo is the nearest rural locality.

References 

Rural localities in Aurgazinsky District